Vivian Coralie (born 11 March 1962) is a Mauritian athlete. He competed in the men's decathlon at the 1984 Summer Olympics.

References

External links
 

1962 births
Living people
Athletes (track and field) at the 1984 Summer Olympics
Mauritian decathletes
Olympic athletes of Mauritius
Place of birth missing (living people)